John Le Gay Brereton  (2 September 1871 – 2 February 1933) was an Australian poet, critic and professor of English at the University of Sydney. He was the first president of the Fellowship of Australian Writers when it was formed in Sydney in 1928.

Early life
Brereton was born in Sydney, the fifth son of John Le Gay Brereton (1827–1886), a well-known Sydney physician who published five volumes of verse between 1857 and 1887, and his wife Mary, née Tongue. His parents had travelled on the Dover Castle from England, arriving in Melbourne on 25 July 1859 and then moved to Sydney. The younger Brereton was educated at Sydney Grammar School from 1881 and the University of Sydney where he graduated BA (1894), reading English under Professor Sir Mungo MacCallum. He was editor of Hermes, the student literary annual, and became the university's chief librarian in 1915.

Brereton became a vegetarian in his youth and never lapsed throughout his life.

Career
Brereton had several occupations and continued his writing, in 1896 he published Perdita, A Sonnet Record, and The Song of Brotherhood and Other Verses. These were followed in 1897 by Sweetheart Mine: Lyrics of Love and Friendship and by Landlopers in (1899), mostly prose, based on a walking tour with Dowell Philip O'Reilly. The verse in Brereton's earlier volumes was pleasant but not very distinguished; however, Sea and Sky (1908) contained stronger work. In 1909 his volume Elizabethan Drama Notes and Studies proclaimed him a scholar of unusual ability and knowledge, and his studies in this period stimulated him to write his one-act play in blank verse To-Morrow: A Dramatic Sketch of the Character and Environment of Robert Greene. This is possibly the best Australian poetical play of its period, and has the merit belonging to comparatively few Australian plays that it is actable.

World War I led to Brereton producing a slender volume of verse published in 1919, The Burning Marl, dedicated to "All who have fought nobly". In 1921 he was appointed professor of English literature at the University of Sydney.

Brereton produced a volume of poems, Swags Up (1928), and a collection of his prose articles and stories was published under the title of Knocking Round (1930). The sketches of Henry Lawson and Dowell O'Reilly are of particular interest. His edition of Lust's Dominion was sent to the Catholic University of Leuven, Belgium in 1914 but was thought lost in the German invasion; it was finally published there in 1931. So Long, Mick! a short one-act play in prose, was also published in 1931. Brereton contributed many letters and poems on diverse subjects to the Sydney Morning Herald, often under the pseudonym 'Basil Garstang'.

Legacy
Brereton died suddenly on 2 February 1933 near Tamworth, New South Wales while on a caravan tour. He had married in 1900 Winifred Odd, who survived him with a daughter and four sons. 
As an Elizabethan scholar, his only rival in Australia in his day was Ernest Henry Clark Oliphant. His prose work was interesting and sensitive, and the best of his verse gives him an assured place among Australian poets. He was entirely unselfish and did much for Lawson when he was most in need of friends.

He was a close friend of and collaborator with Henry Lawson (whom he met in late 1894 through Mary Cameron, later Dame Mary Gilmore), and Christopher Brennan. For at least part of his life, he was a disciple of Annie Besant.

Brereton Park in East Ryde is named in his honour.

Brereton admitted to being profoundly affected by Christopher Marlowe and Walt Whitman, and several of his emotionally intense poems addressed to men, such as 'Cling To Me' ("Cling to me, love, and dare not let me go; Kiss me as though it were our time to die, And all our comradeship had drifted by...Over our love what shelter can I throw?"), have been anthologised in collections of homosexual verse, including Australian Gay and Lesbian Writing: An Anthology (1993), Sexual Heretics: Male homosexuality in English literature from 1850 to 1900 (1970), and The Penguin Book of Homosexual Verse (1983).

Bibliography

 The Song of Brotherhood, and Other Verses (1896)
 Landlopers (1899)
 Sea and Sky (1908)
 The Burning Marl (1919)
 Swags up! (1928)
 Knocking Round (1930)
 Henry Lawson, by his Mates, ed. (1931)

References

External links

 
  ebooks by John LeGay Brereton at Project Gutenberg Australia

1871 births
1933 deaths
Australian poets
Australian literary critics
Australian people of English descent
Writers from Sydney
People educated at Sydney Grammar School
Academic staff of the University of Sydney